Crown Paints is a major paint manufacturer based in Darwen, Lancashire. It is owned by Hempel Group.

History
The origins of the business lie in the history of paint making in Darwen, which can be traced back to the late 1850s. It initially traded as WalPaMur after the initials of The Wall Paper Manufacturers' Company.

Ownership
The company traded independently as Crown Berger for over a century before it was taken over by Williams Holdings in 1987 and then by Akzo Nobel in 1990.

It was sold in a management buyout backed by the private equity firm Endless in August 2008, in a deal to satisfy the European Union's concerns of a possible monopoly after Akzo Nobel's takeover of ICI. 

In June 2011, the company was acquired by Danish paints manufacturer, Hempel Group.

Sponsorship
The company were once sponsors of Liverpool F.C. and  Blackburn Rovers F.C.

References

External links
Official Website
Official Irish Website

Paint and coatings companies of the United Kingdom
Companies based in Lancashire